Samdha  is a village development committee in Mahottari District in the Janakpur Zone of south-eastern Nepal. At the time of the 1991 Nepal census it had a population of 3779 people living in 618 individual households.

References

External links
UN map of the municipalities of Mahottari District

Populated places in Mahottari District